Barranbinja or Barrabinya is an extinct Australian Aboriginal language of New South Wales. The last speaker was probably Mrs Emily Margaret Horneville (d. 1979), who was recorded by Lynette Oates who then published a short description of it. It had also been recorded by R.H. Mathews along with Muruwari, though not all items in his wordlist were recognised by Mrs Horneville. Both Mathews and Oates conclude that Barranbinya and Muruwari were in a dialect relation.

Relationship with other languages 
Lynette Oates' work on Muruwari and Barranbinya gives a cognate count of 44% between the two varieties, concluding that both were likely in a dialect relation. R.H. Mathews (1903), who recorded both Muruwari and Barranbinya, also commented that besides vocabulary differences, the grammar of both Muruwari and Barranbinya were essentially the same.

Together, Muruwari and Barranbinya form an isolate group within the Pama-Nyungan language family, and were very different in many respects from their geographic neighbours (which belong to many different Pama-Nyungan subgroups). For more information, see the description for Muruwari.

Phonology

Phonemic inventory

The phonemic inventory is very similar to Muruwari, although the relative paucity of data means that the status of many phonemes is not clear (in round brackets).

All phonemes except those with a star (*) may be word-initial.

Phonotactics
Nearly all words end in a vowel, though there are some rare occurrences of word-final -ny and -n, which is in stark contrast with neighbouring Muruwari and Ngiyambaa, where word-final nasals and approximants are very common. Oates speculates that this may be he result of influence from Paakantyi and other western languages, which also display a preference for word-final vowels.

References

Central New South Wales languages
Extinct languages of New South Wales